Hood River may refer to:

Rivers
 Hood River (Oregon), United States
 Hood River (Nunavut), Canada
 Hood River (Quebec), in the Watershed of the Saguenay River, Canada

Places
 Hood River, Oregon, a city
 Hood River County, Oregon

Other
Hood River, a dialect of Upper Chinook language

See also